Route 608 is the main road between Garmsir District and Lashkar Gah, the Capital of Helmand Province, Afghanistan.  This 71 kilometer road goes through Nawa-I-Barakzayi District Center and Marja.  In 2008, United States Agency for International Development initiated a US$10,000,000 project (USAID Project #34) to upgrade the road to compacted gravel, but the improvements were largely halted due to Operation Strike of the Sword.

Notes

Helmand Province
Roads in Afghanistan